The seventeenth season of Dancing with the Stars premiered on 9 February 2020. Grant Denyer and Amanda Keller returned to co-host the season while Craig Revel Horwood, Sharna Burgess and Tristan MacManus returned to the judging panel.

Due to the COVID-19 pandemic, the Grand Final was broadcast on 29 March 2020, one week earlier than planned.

Couples
The full cast was announced on 14 January 2020. Professionals Marco De Angelis, Jeremy Garner, Joshua Keeffe and Siobhan Power did not return. They were replaced by Julian Caillon, Shae Mountain and Violeta Mugica with the number of partnerships reduced from 11 to 10 this season.

Scoring chart

  indicate the lowest score for each week
  indicate the highest score for each week
  the couple in the bottom two and lost the face-off, resulting in their elimination
 the couple in the bottom two and won the face-off, resulting in the competition
  the couple earned immunity, and could not be eliminated
  the winning couple
  the runner-up couple
  the third-place couple
  the fourth-place couple

Averages
The extra points from the Disco Marathon in Week 5 and scores by guest judge Courtney Act during the individual round of week 6 are excluded.

*Team dance scores from Week 4 are included in these totals, but dance marathon scores from Week 5 are not.

Highest and lowest scoring performances
The best and worst performances in each dance according to the judges' 30-point scale are as follows (guest judges scores are excluded):

Couples' highest and lowest scoring dances
Scores are based upon a 30-point maximum (team dances and guest judges scores are excluded):

Weekly scores
Unless indicated otherwise, individual judges scores in the charts below (given in parentheses) are listed in this order from left to right: Craig Revel Horwood, Sharna Burgess, Tristan MacManus.

Week 1
Individual judges scores in the chart below (given in parentheses) are listed in this order from left to right: Mandy Moore, Sharna Burgess, Tristan MacManus

The couples performed a cha-cha-cha, foxtrot, tango or Viennese waltz. They were guest judged by Mandy Moore, who replaced Craig Revel Horwood for the first episode while he was in The O2 Arena in London for the final Strictly Come Dancing: The Live Tour! show of 2020.

Running order
{| class="wikitable sortable" style="width:100%"
|-
!width="15.0%"| Couple
!width="12.5%"| Scores
!width="12.5%"| Dance
!width="30.0%"| Music
|-
| Celia & Jarryd
| 18 (6, 6, 6)
| Cha-cha-cha
| "Juice" — Lizzo
|-
| Ed & Jorja
| 14 (5, 4, 5)
| Foxtrot
| "It Had to Be You" — Frank Sinatra
|-
| Chloe & Gustavo
| 18 (5, 6, 7)
| Foxtrot
| "Love Song" — Sara Bareilles
|-
| Christian & Lily
| 18 (6, 6, 6)
| Tango
| "Bad Guy" – Billie Eilish
|-
| Dean & Alexandra
| 11 (4, 3, 4)
| Cha-cha-cha
| "U Can't Touch This" — MC Hammer|-
| Angie & Julian
| 14 (5, 5, 4)
| Foxtrot
| "Grace Kelly" — Mika
|-
| Beau & Megan
| 13 (4, 4, 5)
| Cha-cha-cha
| "Bills" — LunchMoney Lewis
|-
| Travis & Violeta
| 17 (6, 6, 5)
| Viennese waltz
| "Give Me Love" — Ed Sheeran
|-
| Claudia & Aric
| 21 (7, 7, 7)
| Cha-cha-cha
| "Chain of Fools" — Aretha Franklin
|-
| Dami & Shae
| 14 (5, 4, 5)
| Viennese waltz
| "Lover" — Taylor Swift
|-
|}

Week 2
The couples performed one unlearned routine. Salsa and charleston were introduced.

Running orderJudges' votes to save Burgess: Ed & Jorja
 MacManus: Ed & Jorja
 Horwood: Did not vote, but would have voted to save Ed & Jorja

Week 3: My Most Memorable Year
The couples performed one unlearned dance to celebrate the most memorable year of their lives. Contemporary, samba, quickstep, waltz, jive and pasodoble were introduced.

Running orderJudges' votes to save Burgess: Travis & Violeta
 MacManus: Angie & Julian
 Horwood: Travis & Violeta

Week 4: Latin Night
The couples performed one unlearned and team Latin routine. Rumba was introduced.

Running orderJudges' votes to save Burgess: Chloe & Gustavo
 MacManus: Chloe & Gustavo
 Horwood: Did not vote

Week 5: Back to school
The couples performed one unlearned dance and a disco marathon. The two couples with the lowest scores participated in an elimination dance-off where the judges chose who would be eliminated.

Running order

Disco marathon dance-off
In the disco marathon dance-off, the couples danced together. The couples were awarded points depending on when they were voted out by the judges. The first voted out won four points while the winner received ten points, with couples placing indicating the number of points added to their score.Judges' votes to save Burgess: Dami & Shae
 MacManus: Travis & Violeta
 Horwood: Dami & Shae

Week 6: Judges' Team Face Off
Individual judges scores in the chart below (given in parentheses) are listed in this order from left to right: Craig Revel Horwood, Sharna Burgess, Courtney Act, Tristan MacManus

The couples performed one unlearned dance and also had to perform a team-up dance with another couple and one of the three judges. The judges choreographed and designed their team's dance and performed with them on the night, while the two non-performing judges and guest judge, former contestant Courtney Act, scored their routine.

The 2 couples with the lowest score would participate in an elimination dance-off where the judges chose who would continue to the next week.

For the first time in the history of the show, the dancers performed without a live audience.Judges' votes to save Burgess: Ed & Jorja
 MacManus: Ed & Jorja
 Horwood: Did not vote, but would have voted to save Chloe and Gustavo

Week 7: Semi-Finals
The couples performed two unlearned dances to contest their position in the semi-finals. For the second time in the row, the dancers performed without a live audience.

Due to his father Richard Wilkins testing positive to COVID-19, Christian and Lily performed on a hotel roof while Christian was in isolation.Judges' votes to save' Burgess: Claudia & Aric
 MacManus: Claudia & Aric
 Horwood: Did not vote, but would have voted to save Claudia and Aric''

Week 8: Grand Finale
In the first round, the contestants performed a redemption dance. In the second round, the contestants performed a fusion dance of two dance styles dedicated to a meaningful person or event in their life.

For the third time, the dancers performed without a live audience. Craig Revel Horwood was not present in the studio, however judged the show live from his home in London, England.

Dance chart
The celebrities and professional partners danced one of these routines for each corresponding week:
 Week 1: Cha-cha-cha, Foxtrot, Viennese waltz or Tango
 Week 2: One unlearned dance (introducing Salsa and Charleston)
 Week 3 (Most Memorable Year Night): One unlearned dance (introducing Contemporary, Samba, Quickstep, Waltz, Jive and Pasodoble)
 Week 4 (Latin Night): One unlearned dance (introducing Argentine tango and Rumba)
 Week 5 (Back-To-School Night): One unlearned dance and disco marathon dance-off
 Week 6 (Judges' Team Face Off): One unlearned dance and one team dance
 Week 7 (Semi-Finals): Two unlearned dances
 Week 8 (Grand Finale) Redemption and fusion dance

 Highest scoring dance
 Lowest scoring dance
 Not performed or scored
 Won Immunity challenge
 Won Dance Off
 Lost Dance Off

Ratings
 Colour key:
  – Highest rating episode and week during the series
  – Lowest rating episode and week during the series

References

Season 17
2020 Australian television seasons
Television series impacted by the COVID-19 pandemic